The National High School Musical Theatre Awards, more commonly known as the Jimmy Awards, are awards given annually to recognize musical theatre performances by high school students in the United States. Two main awards are given each year, Best Performance by an Actress and Best Performance by an Actor.

Performers qualify as nominees by winning a regional competition in one of approximately 40 participating theatres across the country. Nominees travel to New York City to perform at a talent showcase held on Broadway. Winners and finalists receive a scholarship (in 2019, winners received $25,000 scholarships). Winners and nominees have often gone on to significant careers in musical theatre, such as Eva Noblezada, Reneé Rapp, Ryan McCartan and Andrew Barth Feldman, who went on to starring roles in Broadway productions. The Jimmys have been described by the New York Times as "The Tonys, for teenagers."

History
The Jimmy Awards were inspired by the Gene Kelly Awards, an award given by the Pittsburgh Civic Light Opera since 1991, honoring musical theatre productions put on by high schools in the Pittsburgh area. Van Kaplan, the executive producer of the Pittsburgh Civic Light Opera, pitched the idea of creating a nationwide version of the awards to the Nederlander Organization. The two organizations founded the new award, naming it after the Broadway producer and theatre owner James ("Jimmy") M. Nederlander. The first Jimmy Awards were held in 2009 at NYU's Skirball Center for the Performing Arts, with 32 contestants from 16 regions. The 2010 awards were held at the Marquis Theatre, with all subsequent shows held at the Minskoff Theatre.

The awards became a success, in part due to growing popularity online of videos of performances from the award show (particularly the show's signature medleys). In 2012, PBS released a three-part documentary series, Broadway Or Bust, following the nominees of the Jimmy Awards that year. In 2014, The Broadway League Foundation (the charitable arm of The Broadway League, which produces the Tony Awards) took over the management of the Jimmy awards. The number of participating regional theatres has increased over time, reaching a high of 43 regional competitions (and 86 nominees) in 2019.

The 2020 awards were cancelled due to the COVID-19 pandemic. The 2021 awards were presented virtually.

Qualification
Students qualify for the Jimmys based on a role played in a high school musical production that year. The role must be significant (for example, the character must perform at least one solo).

Approximately 40 theatres belonging to the Broadway League hold "Regional Awards Programs" (RAPs), each of which selects two winners for the region (a Best Actor, and Best Actress) who then become Jimmy Award nominees. The RAP selects candidates by reviewing high school musical productions. Selected candidates perform at an RAP award ceremony (which must be a "full-scale public event" with at least 100 attendees), performing in the same role they played in their high school production.

Award show

The Jimmy Award nominees travel to New York City for a week in June, culminating in a live show in which the winners are determined. During the week, the nominees rehearse their performances for the award show and receive coaching from industry professionals. The show is directed by Van Kaplan and choreographed by Kiesha Lalama.

The award show is held at the Minskoff Theatre on Broadway, and is typically hosted by a celebrated Broadway actor (for example Laura Benanti in 2018).

The show begins with an opening number (typically a "mega-mix of contemporary Broadway hits") involving all nominees, followed by a series of "showcase medleys", in which several nominees appear in costume in the role they performed in their high school's musical, each in turn singing a short solo, while the remaining performers act as backup singers and dancers. These medleys have gained a cult following, with fans appreciating the crossover between disparate popular musicals. Since 2016, due to an increasing number of nominees and time limitations, only a portion of nominees have participated in showcase medleys, with the remainder instead performing in a group number. The medleys are arranged and conducted by musical director Michael Moricz.

During an intermission, a panel of experts selects about eight finalists. During the show's second half, the finalists each perform a solo, and the winners are announced. In addition to the main awards of Best Performance by an Actress and Best Performance by an Actor, other awards are given out with smaller prizes. In 2019, awards were given for Best Dancer, Rising Star, Best Performance in an Ensemble, and Spirit of the Jimmys, each associated with a $2,000 scholarship.

Winners and nominees

References

External links
 The Jimmy Awards official website
 The Jimmy Awards Facebook page

2009 establishments in New York City
American theater awards
Annual events in New York City
Awards established in 2009
Broadway theatre
Competitions in New York City
Recurring events established in 2009